Edzai Kasinauyo (28 March 1975 – 16 June 2017) was a former Zimbabwean football midfielder.

He has been capped for the Zimbabwean national team.
He was in the Zimbabwean squad for the 2006 African Cup of Nations.

Clubs
1995–1999:  CAPS United FC
1999–2000:  Cape Town Spurs
2000–2001:  Ajax Cape Town
2001–2002:  Hellenic FC
2002–2003:  Ajax Cape Town
2003–2006:  Moroka Swallows
2006–2007:  FC AK
2007–2008:  Moroka Swallows

On 30 March 2016, Kasinauyo was expelled by ZIFA over match fixing.

References

1975 births
2017 deaths
Zimbabwean footballers
Zimbabwean expatriate footballers
Cape Town Spurs F.C. players
CAPS United players
Expatriate soccer players in South Africa
Zimbabwe international footballers
Zimbabwean expatriate sportspeople in South Africa
2006 Africa Cup of Nations players
F.C. AK players
Association football midfielders